Carrie L. Lukas (born 1973) is president of the conservative leaning non-profit Independent Women's Forum (IWF). She is also a senior fellow at the Goldwater Institute, a contributor to National Review Online, and a columnist for  Forbes.com.  Before her tenure at the IWF, Lukas worked for then U.S. House of Representative Christopher Cox as the senior domestic policy analyst for the House Republican Policy Committee and a senior staff member of the Homeland Security Committee.

Education
Lukas earned her B.A. from Princeton University and her master's degree in public policy from the Kennedy School of Government at Harvard University.

Career 
Previously, she worked at the Cato Institute as a social security analyst. Lukas has written several studies for the Cato Institute on social security and education policies. Her op-ed pieces have been published in, among other publications, The Washington Post, The Wall Street Journal, The New York Post, and USA Today. She is author of the books The Politically Incorrect Guide to Women, Sex, and Feminism and Liberty is No War on Women. Lukas is a regular guest on the Thom Hartmann show on the Air America radio network and in May 2009 appeared in an ABC 20/20 special produced by John Stossel.

She has been working with the INADI (Instituto Nacional contra la Discriminación, la Xenofobia y el Racismo) in Argentina since 2008.

Political positions
Lukas believes that minimum wage laws adversely affect the young and those with low skill levels.

References

External links
 Independent Women's Forum profile
 

American political writers
Harvard Kennedy School alumni
Princeton University alumni
1973 births
Living people
Place of birth missing (living people)
Date of birth missing (living people)
American libertarians
American feminist writers
Individualist feminists
National Review people